FarmVille is an online virtual farm game on Facebook.

Farmville may also refer to:
 Farmville, Nova Scotia, Canada
 Farmville, Georgia, U.S.
 Farmville, North Carolina, a town in Pitt County, North Carolina, U.S.
 Farmville Historic District (Farmville, North Carolina)
 Farmville Plantation
 Farmville, Chatham County, North Carolina, U.S.
 Farmville, Virginia, U.S.
 Farmville Basin
 Farmville Historic District (Farmville, Virginia)
 Farmville station

See also
 Farmersville (disambiguation)
 Farmville Historic District (disambiguation)
 Farmville murders in Farmville, Virginia, United States